Joakim Wrele (born 7 January 1991) is a Swedish footballer who plays for as a midfielder for IL Hødd.

References

External links

1991 births
Living people
Association football midfielders
Halmstads BK players
Allsvenskan players
Superettan players
Swedish footballers
IL Hødd players
Norwegian First Division players
Expatriate footballers in Norway